The Bristol City Centre (Haymarket) Hotel, formerly known as Avon House, is an 18-storey building, one of the tallest structures in central Bristol, England. It is situated adjacent to The Bearpit roundabout.

History
The building formed part of an initiative in the 1960s by Bristol City Council to redevelop the St. James Barton area which had been badly damaged by bombing during the Bristol Blitz of the Second World War and had remained semi derelict since the end of the war.

Planning permission was given for a tall building in the international style in 1967 and the construction work took place between 1969 and 1972. The visual impact of the scheme was criticised by English Heritage who said that "it was bulk rather than height that damaged the skyline."

Avon House was built speculatively but was occupied by the former Avon County Council when it was formed in April 1974. In 1987, when the television presenter, Caron Keating, visited Bristol to launch the Christmas carnival procession, she joined three dwarves in abseiling down the face of Avon House, as part of a fund raising initiative in support of the Bristol Royal Hospital for Children.

After Avon County Council was abolished in 1996 the building was used as workspace by Bristol City Council staff for a few years before it became redundant. It was converted into a hotel in 1999 and was subsequently rebranded as a Premier Inn.

See also
 List of tallest buildings and structures in Bristol

References

Buildings and structures in Bristol
Buildings and structures completed in 1972
County halls in England